The 2022 Copa Sudamericana first stage was played from 8 to 17 March 2022. A total of 32 teams competed in the first stage to decide 16 of the 32 places in the group stage of the 2022 Copa Sudamericana.

Draw

The draw for the first stage was held on 20 December 2021, 12:00 PYST (UTC−3), at the CONMEBOL Convention Centre in Luque, Paraguay. For the first stage, the 32 teams involved were divided into eight pots according to their national association.

The 32 teams were drawn into 16 ties, with the four teams from each national association being drawn against a rival from the same association in two ties per association and the first team drawn in each tie hosting the second leg.

Format

In the first stage, each tie was played on a home-and-away two-legged basis. If tied on aggregate, extra time was not played, and a penalty shoot-out was used to determine the winner (Regulations Article 2.4.2).

The 16 winners of the first stage advanced to the group stage to join the 12 teams directly qualified for that stage (six from Argentina and six from Brazil), and four teams transferred from the Copa Libertadores (the four teams eliminated in the third stage of qualifying).

Matches
The first legs were played on 8–10 March, while the second legs were played on 15–17 March 2021.

|}

Match BOL 1

Jorge Wilstermann won 4–3 on aggregate and advanced to the group stage (BOL 1).

Match BOL 2

Oriente Petrolero won 6–2 on aggregate and advanced to the group stage (BOL 2).

Match CHI 1

Tied 2–2 on aggregate, Deportes Antofagasta won on penalties and advanced to the group stage (CHI 1).

Match CHI 2

Unión La Calera won 2–1 on aggregate and advanced to the group stage (CHI 2).

Match COL 1

Junior won 3–1 on aggregate and advanced to the group stage (COL 1).

Match COL 2

Tied 3–3 on aggregate, Independiente Medellín won on penalties and advanced to the group stage (COL 2).

Match ECU 1

9 de Octubre won 3–1 on aggregate and advanced to the group stage (ECU 1).

Match ECU 2

LDU Quito won 3–1 on aggregate and advanced to the group stage (ECU 2).

Match PAR 1

Guaireña won 1–0 on aggregate and advanced to the group stage (PAR 1).

Match PAR 2

General Caballero (JLM) won 5–1 on aggregate and advanced to the group stage (PAR 2).

Match PER 1

Ayacucho won 4–3 on aggregate and advanced to the group stage (PER 1).

Match PER 2

Melgar won 2–1 on aggregate and advanced to the group stage (PER 2).

Match URU 1

Montevideo Wanderers won 3–1 on aggregate and advanced to the group stage (URU 1).

Match URU 2

River Plate won 3–0 on aggregate and advanced to the group stage (URU 2).

Match VEN 1

Metropolitanos won 6–0 on aggregate and advanced to the group stage (VEN 1).

Match VEN 2

Deportivo La Guaira won 3–2 on aggregate and advanced to the group stage (VEN 2).

Notes

References

External links
CONMEBOL Sudamericana 2022, CONMEBOL.com
CONMEBOL Sudamericana

1
March 2022 sports events in South America